Sandra Wheeler Hester is an activist and former television host from New Orleans.

Prior to Hurricane Katrina, she hosted the Hester Report on Public-access television in New Orleans.  Her programs were generally critical of local government, particularly the Orleans Parish School Board.  After the storm, she settled in Glasgow, Missouri.  She continues to be active in New Orleans social issues, frequently disrupting public meetings.

References

External links
http://www.nola.com/rose/t-p/index.ssf?/rose/katrina/sandra_wheeler_hester.html
http://b.rox.com/2006/09/07/the-hester-report/
http://habitatforurbanity.wordpress.com/2006/08/21/have-you-seen-this-woman/
http://thethirdbattleofneworleans.blogspot.com/2005/11/hester-report.html

Living people
Activists from Louisiana
People from New Orleans
People from Glasgow, Missouri
Year of birth missing (living people)